Jonathan Amaral, known professionally as Jonathan Gaming, is an Indian esports player who is known for playing Battlegrounds Mobile India (BGMI). Jonathan received the nomination for Esports Mobile Player of the Year, becoming the second Indian player after Mortal  to receive such recognition. The 2022 Esports Award unveiled the top three players in the Esports Mobile Player of the Year category, with Jonathan coming in at second place. FanClash, the esports fantasy platform, has declared that Jonathan will be serving as their new brand ambassador.

Early life 
Jonathan was born in Goa to parents Jude Amaral, a businessman, and Leticia Noronha Amaral, a homemaker. He comes from a Christian family and has a sister named Larisa Amaral. At a later time, Jonathan and his family relocated to Mumbai.

Professional career 
Jonathan began his esports journey with TSM Entity and is now a member of Godlike Esports. He was selected to represent India at the 2021 PUBG Mobile Global Championship, despite his fourth place finish at the BGIS 2021 tournament. Jonathan commenced his professional esports career in 2019 and quickly established himself as one of the top players, having achieved a strong finish at the PMCO Global Finals that same year. At the 2020 PMIS Semifinals, Jonathan made a remarkable performance by recording 16 kills, the highest individual kill count ever recorded in a tournament. This impressive feat earned him a great deal of respect and admiration from his fellow gamers.

Recently, Jonathan and a group of Indian streamers and content creators made a request to BGMI to ban hackers from the platform. 7Sea Esports extended an offer for Jonathan to join their team, but the Godlike player declined due to coordination difficulties.  Following the Government of India's ban of BGMI, Jonathan addressed the issue of the future of the game to Krafton.

Filmography

Awards and nominations

References 

2002 births
Living people
Indian esports players